The 2017 Wuhan Open (also known as the 2017 Dongfeng Motor Wuhan Open for sponsorship reasons) was a women's tennis tournament played on outdoor hard courts between September 24–30, 2017. It was the 4th edition of the Wuhan Open, and part of the WTA Premier 5 tournaments of the 2017 WTA Tour. The tournament was held at the Optics Valley International Tennis Center in Wuhan, China.

Points and prize money

Point distribution

Prize money

Singles main-draw entrants

Seeds

 Rankings are as of September 18, 2017

Other entrants
The following players received wild cards into the singles main draw:
  Duan Yingying 
  Jil Teichmann   
  Wang Yafan

The following players received entry using a protected ranking into the singles main draw:
  Sloane Stephens

The following players received entry from the singles qualifying draw:
  Ons Jabeur
  Varvara Lepchenko
  Magda Linette
  Christina McHale
  Monica Niculescu
  Andrea Petkovic
  Monica Puig
  Maria Sakkari

Withdrawals
Before the tournament
  Timea Bacsinszky → replaced by  Wang Qiang
  Mirjana Lučić-Baroni → replaced by  Ashleigh Barty
  Lucie Šafářová → replaced by  Yulia Putintseva
  CoCo Vandeweghe → replaced by  Donna Vekić

Doubles main-draw entrants

Seeds

 Rankings are as of September 18, 2017

Other entrants
The following pairs received wildcards into the doubles main draw:
  Guo Shanshan /  Ye Qiuyu
  Wang Qiang /  Wang Yafan

The following pair received entry as alternates:
  Mona Barthel /  Carina Witthöft

Withdrawals
Before the tournament
  Monica Niculescu
  Jeļena Ostapenko
  Anastasia Pavlyuchenkova

During the tournament
  Ashleigh Barty

Retirements
  Ekaterina Makarova
  Wang Qiang
  Carina Witthöft

Champions

Singles

  Caroline Garcia def.  Ashleigh Barty, 6–7(3–7), 7–6(7–4), 6–2

Doubles

  Chan Yung-jan /  Martina Hingis def.  Shuko Aoyama /  Yang Zhaoxuan, 7–6(7–5), 3–6, [10–4]

External links
 Official website